Juvenal is a surname and given name.

Persons

Surname
James Juvenal, American rower

Given name
Juvenal Amarijo, Brazilian former football defender
Juvenal Edjogo-Owono, Equatoguinean professional footballer
Juvénal Habyarimana, Rwandan Hutu politician 
Juvenal Olmos, Chilean football coach and former football midfielder
Juvenal Ordoñez, Peruvian politician and a Congressman
Juvénal Rugambarara, mayor of Bicumi
Juvénal Uwilingiyimana, Rwandan politician

Saints 
Juvenal of Benevento (died 132 A.D.)
Juvenal of Narni (d. 369), Bishop of Narni
Juvenal of Jerusalem (d. 458), Bishop of Jerusalem
Giovenale Ancina (d. 1604), beatus
Juvenaly of Alaska (1761-1795), first martyr of the Russian Orthodox church in the Americas

See also
 Saint Juvenal (disambiguation)
 Juvenal, Decimus Iunius Iuvenalis, 2nd century Roman poet
 Jean Juvénal des Ursins (1388–1473), French chronicler and Bishop of Beauvais
 Juvenal (Poyarkov) (b. 1935), Metropolitan of Krutitsy and Kolomna, archbishop of the Russian Orthodox Church